Jahon Rad (born June 13, 2001) is an American soccer player who plays for Sporting Kansas City II in the USL Championship via the Sporting Kansas City Academy.

Career
Joining the Sporting Kansas City Academy in 2016 alongside his brother Kaveh Rad, Jahon played with USL Championship side Swope Park Rangers during their 2018 season from Sporting Kansas City's academy. He made his first professional appearance on July 10, 2018, as a 55th-minute substitute during a 1–3 loss to Sacramento Republic.

Rad again joined the SKC reserve team (Sporting Kansas City II) on July 2, 2020, signing another Academy contract. He made his 2020 debut with the club in a 1–0 win against the Indy Eleven on August 1, 2020.

In September 2022, Jahon Rad was named Sporting Kansas City II player of the year after the inaugural MLS Next Pro season.

Personal
Rad's twin brother, Kaveh, also plays soccer for Sporting Kansas City, and his brother Cyrus Rad is also a professional soccer player.

Career statistics

Honors
Individual
Sporting Kansas City II Most Valuable Player: 2022

References

External links 
 Sporting KC profile
 

2001 births
Living people
American soccer players
Iranian footballers
Sporting Kansas City II players
Association football midfielders
Soccer players from North Carolina
USL Championship players
Sportspeople of Iranian descent
American people of Iranian descent
Rad family
Twin sportspeople
MLS Next Pro players